The Wonderful Wizard of Oz (2005) is a collection of three stories adapting the novel The Wonderful Wizard of Oz (1900) by L. Frank Baum. The stories were written by David Chauvel with art by Enrique Fernandez.

The books were first published in French by Delcourt (2005) as Le Magicien d'Oz, continuing Delcourt Jeunesse's theme of adapting classic works in a graphic novel format. The album in English was published in the United States by Image Comics, on January 2, 2007. The three-part book received the Grand Prix de La Ville de Lyon award for illustration in 2005.

Its art inspired American artists Skottie Young's design for the adaptation he made in 2009 for Marvel Comics, with Fernandez sharing that Young said he had Fernandez's comics on the desk while working on his own designs.

References

2005 graphic novels
Comics based on Oz (franchise)